The Eugene Apartments is a building complex located in northwest Portland, Oregon listed on the National Register of Historic Places.

See also
 National Register of Historic Places listings in Northwest Portland, Oregon

References

1930 establishments in Oregon
Individually listed contributing properties to historic districts on the National Register in Oregon
Northwest Portland, Oregon
Portland Historic Landmarks
Residential buildings completed in 1930
Apartment buildings on the National Register of Historic Places in Portland, Oregon
Spanish Revival architecture in Oregon